The SZD-13 Wampir (Szybowcowy Zakład Doświadczalny - Glider Experimental Works) was a single-seat tail-less glider designed and built in Poland from 1955.

Development 
The SZD-13 Wampir was a development of the SZD-6X Nietoperz, using a NACA laminar flow aerofoil. Main designer was Irena Kaniewska. Wind tunnel tests on the prototype were not encouraging, so it was not flown, in favor of the more advanced SZD-20 Wampir II.

Specifications and predicted performance (SZD-13 Wampir)

See also

References

Taylor, J. H. (ed) (1989) Jane's Encyclopedia of Aviation. Studio Editions: London. p. 29

External links
http://www.piotrp.de/SZYBOWCE/pszd13.htm
http://www.vintagesailplanes.de/SZD_Wampir.html

SZD-13
1950s Polish experimental aircraft
Tailless aircraft
SZD aircraft